Colegio San Andrés is a private school located in Lima, Peru.

History
Dr. Mackay was given permission to found the Anglo-Peruvian School on July 13, 1917.  In 1919 the primary school expanded into secondary education as well, changing its name to Colegio Anglo-Peruano.  The school then consisted of 7 teachers and 271 pupils.

In 1924, while the school was still located at its premises on the Plaza Francia, it merged with the American Institute and became a boysonly institution.

Through the initiative of Dr. W. Stanley Rycroft and with the collaboration of Dr. Alberto Arca Parró, a distinguished teacher at the school, the Leader magazine was founded in 1926.  In the words of its first editorial, the Leader aspired to "be the voice of educational development, and be able to unite the voice of teachers and students in the process of development and reinterpretation of the basic principles of teaching."

The school moved to its present site in 1930. The thenPresident of Peru, Augusto B. Leguía, was an honoured guest at the occasion.

In 1942, in compliance with the dictates of Government Resolution N°3, announced by the Ministry of Education, the school changed its name again, becoming the Colegio San Andrés.

The school was opened to female students in 1994.  The class of 2004 was the first coeducational class to graduate.

Philosophy
Since the school was founded under charter from the Free Church of Scotland, the defining ideals of the school are principally derived from the church's philosophy and biblical teachings.

The institution, being a religious institution, teaches all its subjects from a Biblical viewpoint, not only for religion and ethics, but also for all aspects of education.

Notable alumni

Among its former students are:

 tenor Luis Alva
 sociologist Julio Cotler
 Leslie Lee
 actor Eduardo Moll
 musician Alejandro Bisetti Vanderghem
 former Minister of Economy César Vásquez Bazán
 former Prime Minister and Foreign Affairs Minister Efraín Goldenberg Schreiber
 congressman Humberto Lay
 concert pianist Alexandros Kapelis
 scientist Dr Félix Antonio Bacigalupo Palomino
 renowned physician Dante Peñaloza Ramella recipient of the 2008 SOUTHERN PERU, cofounder of Universidad Peruana Cayetano Heredia
 businessman and former Prime Minister Salomón Lerner Ghitis 
Alfredo Salazar Southwell, Peruvian Air Force hero
Nicolás Lindley López, 84th President of Peru
Gustavo R. Paz-Pujalt, Peruvian Scientist
Eduardo Tokeshi, Peruvian Artist
Dr. Dante Peñaloza Ramella, Scientist, 
Víctor Raúl Haya de la Torre, Former Staff
Herbert Money, Former Staff
Luis Felipe Angells "Sofocleto" Writer
Luis Jimenez Borra Member of Lima city council

Bibliography
John M. MacPherson, At the Roots of a Nation: The Story of San Andres School in Lima, Peru (Edinburgh: The Knox Press (Edinburgh), 1993)
John Mackay Metzger, The Hand and the Road: The Life and Times of John A. Mackay (Louisville, KY: Westminster John Knox Press, 2010)

References

External links

 Website
 Old Boys Association
 ADCA
 Himno

Private schools in Peru
Educational institutions established in 1917
Education in Lima
1917 establishments in Peru
Private schools